Vitrolles is the name of several communes in France:

 Vitrolles, Bouches-du-Rhône, in the Bouches-du-Rhône département
 Vitrolles, Hautes-Alpes, in the Hautes-Alpes département
 Vitrolles-en-Lubéron, in the Vaucluse département